Neo-experimental literature (Arabic المدرسة الحائية) is a trend, since 2006, in Arab literature. 

The school name was coined by Moroccan short-story writer Mohamed Saïd Raïhani and his circle in Morocco. Its adherents work exclusively with narrative forms, and mainly in fiction, setting three main goals:
 Experimenting with newer narrative forms and themes 
 Showing content through narrative form
 Restricting narrative themes to freedom, dreams and love

Literary movements
Arabic literature